The National Democratic Action of São Tomé and Príncipe (ADNSTP) was a political party formed by São Toméan exiles who opposed the socialist policies of the single party Movement for the Liberation of São Tomé and Príncipe (MLSTP) government.

Political parties in São Tomé and Príncipe